New Oregon is a small hamlet in the town of North Collins in southern Erie County, New York, United States.  The hamlet is on the South Branch Eighteen Mile Creek.

History
In 1860, there were 357 residents, mostly farmers.  Various trades noted in that year's Federal Census were: Saw Mill Sawyer (William Doane), School Master (Joseph Rohmer), Butcher (Charles Thill), Grocer (John Thiel and Antoine Smith), Shoemaker (Michael Mayer, Frank Gamel, and Mathias Keuhman), Blacksmith (Samuel Clark and Valentine Schaus), and Seaman (Uriah Clark).  The value of real estate was $85,650 and personal property $26,275.

Catholic Church
The New Oregon Catholics wanted a church nearby and adapted a wood frame building with a dirt floor. The priest from East Eden would minister in this church. The first Mass was celebrated January 1, 1858 with the Parish named Saint Mary of the Immaculate Conception.

In 1866, the Parish purchased the New Oregon Methodist Church building and made additions.  In a 1944 history of the Parish, it was noted that "The late Mr. Nicholas Schmitt and many other deceased parishioners, rendered faithful, untiring, noncompensating (sic) assistance in laying the cornerstone and general construction."

In the fall of 2006, the Parish was merged with Saint Martin and Saint Frances Cabrini to form Epiphany of Our Lord Parish in Langford and the New Oregon Church was closed.  In 2007, the buildings were purchased and now operate as the Marienthal Inn.

Post Office
New Oregon had its own post office from 1854 to 1903.  In 1883, there was a mail route from Collins Center, through Morton's Corners and Woodward's Hollow to New Oregon.

References

Hamlets in New York (state)
Hamlets in Erie County, New York